Ratheesh (1954–2002) was an Indian actor best known for his work in Malayalam cinema. He was a native of Kalavoor in the Alappuzha district of Kerala, India. He performed villainous roles during the 1990s. He had acted in 158 films with directors such as K. G. George, I. V. Sasi, Joshiy, P. G. Vishwambharan, Thampy Kannamthanam, Sreekumaran Thampi, Rajasenan,P.K.Joseph and Shaji Kailas. Unlike other villains of the time, Ratheesh captivated the Malayalam movie lovers with his charms and handsome looks.

Personal life

He was born to Puthenpurayil V. Rajagopalan and Padmavathi amma at Kalavoor, Alappuzha. He had two sisters, Sherly and Laila. He had his education from Sree Narayana College, Kollam and S.N. College, Cherthala.
He was married to Diana, who is the daughter of· Ex minister M.K. Hemachandran, on 11 September 1983. The couple have four children Parvathy, Padmaraj, Padma and Pranav. He died due to a heart attack at his home in Coimbatore on 23 December 2002, aged just 48.

Career

Ratheesh started his career in the Malayalam film Vezhambal in 1977. But it was K. G. George who provided his big break through Ullkadal in 1979. He became a bankable star through I. V. Sasi's Thusharam in 1981. From 1981 to 1988 he was at the peak of his career, performing in films like Oru Mukham Pala Mukham, Ee Nadu, Rajavinte Makan, Muhoortham 11.30, Sankharsham, Vazhiyorakazhchakal, Aayiram Kannukal, Abkari, Unaroo, Ithraym Kaalam, Uyarangalil, Thanthram, Akkachiyude Kunjuvava, John Jaffer Janardhanan, Innalenkil Nale  and Ponthooval. After 1988 he reduced the number of films in which he acted, he quit altogether after 1990. After a period of four years he made a comeback as the antagonist through Shaji Kailas's Commissioner. Throughout the 1990s, he did various villainous and character roles in films such as Kashmeeram, Nirnayam, Yuvathurki, 19 April, and Gangothri. In the 2000s, he was notable for his roles in Ravanaprabhu and Danny.

Filmography

As an actor

Malayalam

Tamil films

Produced films
 Iyer The Great
 Chakkikotha Chankaran
 Black Mail
 Revenge
 Ente Shabtham

Television
2001: Venalmazha (Surya TV) opposite to sreevidhya
2001 : Anna (Kairali TV)

References

 Ratheesh at MSI
 The Hindu news
 Ratheesh at Internet Movie Database

Male actors from Alappuzha
1954 births
2002 deaths
Male actors in Malayalam cinema
Indian male film actors
People from Alappuzha district
20th-century Indian male actors
21st-century Indian male actors